The Standard-type battleship was a series of twelve battleships across five classes ordered for the United States Navy between 1911 and 1916 and commissioned between 1916 and 1923. These were considered super-dreadnoughts, with the ships of the final two classes incorporating many lessons from the Battle of Jutland.

Each vessel was produced with a series of progressive innovations, which contributed to the pre–World War I arms race. The twelve vessels constituted the US Navy's main battle line in the interwar period, while many of the ten earlier dreadnoughts were scrapped or relegated to secondary duties. Restrictions under the 1922 Washington Naval Treaty limited total numbers and size of battleships and had required some under construction to be cancelled,  so it was not until the onset of World War II that new battleships were constructed. On December 7, 1941, eight were at Pearl Harbor, one at Bremerton, Washington, and three were assigned to the Atlantic Fleet.

Doctrine 
The Standard type, by specifying common tactical operational characteristics between classes, allowed battleships of different classes to operate together as a tactical unit (BatDiv) against enemy battleships. By contrast, other navies had fast and slow battleship classes that could not operate together unless limited to the performance of the ship with slowest speed and widest turning circle. Otherwise the battle line would be split into separate "fast" and "slow" wings. The Standard type was optimized for the battleship-centric naval strategy of the era of their design.

The next US battleship classes, beginning with the  designed in the late 1930s and commissioned in 1941, marked a departure from the Standard type, introducing the fast battleships needed to escort the aircraft carriers that came to dominate naval strategy.

List of Standard-type battleships 

 Damaged as a result of the attack on Pearl Harbor
 Total loss as a result of the attack on Pearl Harbor

Characteristics of the Standard type included:
 all-or-nothing armor scheme
 All main guns on the centerline in fore and aft turrets with no amidships guns
 top speed of 
 tactical turn radius of 700 yards

The Colorado-class, the first US battleships to mount  guns, represented the endpoint of the gradual evolution of the "Standard Type" battleships. The next planned class of Standard battleships, the never-completed s, represented a significant increase in size and armament over the Colorados.

Service history

World War I 
All the Standard Type were oil-burning. Since oil was scarce in the British Isles, only Nevada and Oklahoma actively participated in World War I by escorting convoys across the Atlantic Ocean between the United States and Britain.

Interwar years 
All the Standard Types were modernized during the 1920s and 1930s. The cage masts of all but the Tennessee and Colorado classes were replaced with tripod masts topped with fire-control directors, torpedo tubes were removed and anti-aircraft guns were upgraded. Main battery elevation in the older ships was increased to 30 degrees for greater range. Most of the Standards received anti-torpedo bulges. Each ship received one or two catapults and recovery cranes for operating floatplanes for scouting and gunnery spotting.

World War II 
On December 7, 1941, Colorado was undergoing overhaul at Puget Sound Navy Yard, while the three ships of the New Mexico class were assigned to the Atlantic Fleet, and the remaining eight Standard Type battleships were at Pearl Harbor forming Battleship Row.

During the Pearl Harbor Attack, Arizonas forward magazine exploded from a bomb hit and Oklahoma capsized after multiple torpedo strikes, both with significant losses of life. West Virginia and California were also sunk, while Nevada managed to get underway and was beached shortly afterward. Tennessee and Maryland each received two bomb hits.

Arizona and Oklahoma were considered permanent losses, but the other damaged and sunk battleships were salvaged and sent to the West Coast for repairs, where they also received varying degrees of upgrades similar to the features on the new South Dakota fast battleships. Tennessee, California and West Virginia emerged as the most modernized, though their widened beam exceeded the Panama Canal restrictions which limited their operations to the Pacific. Maryland, Colorado, and Pennsylvania received twin turret mounts of 5"/38 DP guns, while Nevada also had her superstructure significantly rebuilt.

The ten surviving Standard Type battleships served throughout World War II primarily as fire support for amphibious landings. Their low speed relegated them to second line duties as they were too slow to accompany the fleet carriers that had become the dominant combatant. Six of them participated in the last battleship versus battleship engagement in naval history, the Battle of Surigao Strait, where none of them were hit.

Fates 
Arizona and Oklahoma were destroyed at Pearl Harbor on December 7, 1941. Their sister ships Pennsylvania and Nevada were used as targets in the Operation Crossroads atomic tests in 1946. In 1946 Mississippi was converted to a test vessel for new gun and missile systems and served until 1956. Most other Standard-type battleships were decommissioned in 1946 or 1947 and placed in the reserve fleet; ultimately all were scrapped by 1959.

References 

Battleships
Battleships of the United States
Battleships of the United States Navy
United States Standard type battleships
World War II battleships of the United States